Samuel Dickerson Rockenbach (27 January 1869 – 16 May 1952) was an American Brigadier General and father of the United States Tank Corps.

Biography 
Rockenbach was born in Lynchburg, Virginia on January 27, 1869, the son of Frank J. Rockenbach and Jane Nicolson Rockenbach. He attended the Virginia Military Institute, where he graduated third in the class of 1889 and was designated a distinguished graduate.

In 1898, Rockenbach married Emma Baldwin, who was the daughter of Theodore Anderson Baldwin.

Rockenbach was the commander of Kemper Military School and also served in the Missouri Militia. He received a commission in the United States Cavalry in 1891.  He served repeatedly with Brigadier General John J. Pershing, including serving as quartermaster during the Pancho Villa Expedition. In 1912, Rockenbach graduated from the United States Army War College.

During World War I 
In December 1917, eight months after the American entry into World War I, he was appointed by Pershing, now the Commander-in-Chief of the American Expeditionary Forces (AEF) on the Western Front, to command the AEF's Tank Corps.

In 1918, Rockenbach organized, trained, equipped, and deployed the first American tank units to the European Western Front during World War I.

After World War I 
He remained chief of the Tanks Corps until 1920.  He directed the tank school at Fort Meade, Maryland until 1924.

From 1928 to his retirement in 1933, he commanded the Second Artillery Brigade at Fort Sam Houston, Texas.

Rockenbach died on May 16, 1952.

Awards
Rockenbach received the Army Distinguished Service Medal. The citation for the medal reads:

In addition, he was a recipient of the French Croix de Guerre and Officer of the Legion of Honor awards, and the Commander of the Order of the Bath from Great Britain.

Legacy
His papers are held by the Virginia Military Institute.

References

External links

1869 births
1952 deaths
American military personnel of the Spanish–American War
Burials at Arlington National Cemetery
United States Army personnel of the Indian Wars
United States Army Cavalry Branch personnel
Military personnel from Virginia
Recipients of the Distinguished Service Medal (US Army)
United States Army War College alumni
United States Army generals of World War I
United States Army generals